Race-norming, more formally called within-group score conversion and score adjustment strategy, is the practice of adjusting test scores to account for the race or ethnicity of the test-taker. In the United States, it was first implemented by the Federal Government in 1981 with little publicity, and was subsequently outlawed by the Civil Rights Act of 1991. 

Prior to being banned by the federal government, race-norming was practiced by 38 U.S. states' employment services. The aim of this practice is to counteract alleged racial bias in aptitude tests administered to job applicants, as well as in neuropsychological tests. The argument was that it guarantees racial balance and this was confirmed by a National Research Council panel evaluating its validity when predicting job performance. The practice converted and compared the raw score of the test according to racial groups. The score of a black candidate is only compared to the scores of those who had the same ethnicity. If the candidate's score, which is reported within a percentile range, fell within a certain percentile when compared to white or all candidates, it would be much higher among other black candidates.

Criticism

Race-norming has been criticized as racist towards Black people and has been compared to eugenics and pseudoscientific racism. In 2021, such criticisms surfaced following an announcement by the National Football League that they will cease to use the practice in determining settlements for players' injuries.

University of Delaware professor Linda Gottfredson has been very critical of this practice, as have conservative columnist George Will and law professor Robert J. Delahunty. Criticism was based on the perception that race-norming was biased in favor of blacks. In the 1980s, the Reagan administration ordered a study into the unadjusted General Aptitude Test Battery (without race-norming); the results, released in 1989, showed that unadjusted test scores were not strongly related to job performance.

On June 2, 2021, the National Football League (NFL) announced that they would halt the use of race-norming that assumed Black NFL players started out with lower cognitive functioning in a $1 billion dollar brain injury settlement.

References

External links
Definition at Oxford Living Dictionary

Psychological testing

Industrial and organizational psychology
Scientific racism